D.E.Ü. Tınaztepe Kampüsü is a proposed underground station on the Üçyol—Çamlıkule Line of the İzmir Metro. It will be located beneath Doğuş Avenue in southeast Buca, next to the Dokuz Eylül University's Tınaztepe campus. Construction of the station, along with the metro line, is expected to begin in 2020. A new maintenance facility will also be constructed just east of the station.

D.E.Ü. Tınaztepe Kampüsü station is expected to open in 2024.

References

İzmir Metro
Railway stations scheduled to open in 2024
Rapid transit stations under construction in Turkey
Dokuz Eylül University